Loryma is a genus of snout moths described by Francis Walker in 1859.

Species

Loryma actenioides (Rebel, 1914)
Loryma alluaudalis Leraut, 2009
Loryma ambovombealis Leraut, 2009
Loryma aridalis Rothschild, 1913
Loryma athalialis (Walker, 1859)
Loryma basalis (Walker, 1865)
Loryma bilinealis (Amsel, 1961)
Loryma callos (Viette, 1973)
Loryma creperalis (Swinhoe, 1886)
Loryma daganialis (Amsel, 1956)
Loryma discimaculla (Hampson, 1917)
Loryma egregialis (Herrich-Schäffer, 1838)
Loryma hypotialis (Swinhoe, 1886)
Loryma itremoalis Leraut, 2009
Loryma marginalis Rothschild, 1921
Loryma martinae Leraut, 2002
Loryma masamalis Leraut, 2009
Loryma radamalis (Ragonot, 1891)
Loryma recusata (Walker, 1863)
Loryma sentiusalis Walker, 1859
Loryma sinuosalis Leraut, 2007

References

Pyralini
Pyralidae genera
Taxa named by Francis Walker (entomologist)